Uleh Kari Asalem (also Romanized as Ūleh Karī Āsālem; also known as Ūlākerī and Ūleh Karīm) is a village in Asalem Rural District, Asalem District, Talesh County, Gilan Province, Iran. At the 2006 census, its population was 847, in 203 families.

References 

Populated places in Talesh County